"16B" is a song by Filipino-Australian singer-actor James Reid. The song was released on May 5, 2018 as the lead single off the collaborative mixtape from his own label Careless Music Manila.

Background
According to "Push", Reid explained in his Instagram post that the lyrics were inspired by a close friend. He also stated that "16B is a place, a place where even the most fiery of souls can get lost in the pretty lights."

Music video
An accompany music video for the song was released on Reid's birthday on May 11, 2018 via Careless Music Manila's YouTube channel.

Critical reception
"16B" received positive reviews from music critics, but was also criticized for its provocative lyrics.

References

2018 songs
2018 singles
James Reid (actor) songs
English-language Filipino songs